Finn Sletten (born 11 August 1952) is a Norwegian jazz musician (drums and percussions).

Career 
Sletten was born in Bodø. After a study tour to Arizona (1968–70), he played in his home town with such musicians as Paul Weeden Band at Festival of North Norway (1972) and an album (1974). In Oslo he participated in Magni Wentzel Quintet, including Jon Eberson (guitar), Tore Brunborg (saxophone) and Jon Balke (keyboards) among others. From 1988 he was involved in "Trio Nord" (1988), Ola Bremness Vær hilset! (1995), Marit Sandvik band, Nordland jazzforums Distant Reports (2001), Tore Johansen and Jan Gunnar Hoff's production Free Flows (2005).

Sletten assisted the jazz poet Triztán Vindtorn with percussion on Cecilie Jordal (2001)., a portion of the presentation "Philosophiske Smuler". He also contributes to the Bodø Domkor's Christmas jazz and Beiarn jazz camp, and was recently on contributor Kristin Mellem and Bjørn Andor Drage's film music to Nærkontakt med brunbjørn.

Sletten was at the Festival of North Norway 2009 awarded Stubøprisen to have been "a significant pioneer and inspiration to generations of north Norwegian jazz musicians". That same year he also received the prestigious Gammleng-prisen in the class jazz by "Fond for utøvende kunstnere".

Honors 
2009: Stubøprisen
2009: Gammleng-prisen in the class Jazz

Discography 
With Morten Halle, Jon Eberson & Bjørn Kjellemyr
1990: Blow! (Odin Records)
1992: 2 (Curling Legs)

References

External links 

Finn Sletten Biography at "Norsk Musikkinformasjon" MIV.no

Avant-garde jazz musicians
20th-century Norwegian drummers
21st-century Norwegian drummers
Norwegian jazz drummers
Male drummers
Norwegian jazz composers
Musicians from Bodø
1952 births
Living people
20th-century drummers
Male jazz composers
20th-century Norwegian male musicians
21st-century Norwegian male musicians
Ab und Zu members